Amarupur is a village located in Mohammadabad tehsil of Ghazipur district, Uttar Pradesh. It has total 146 families residing. Amarupur has population of 1216 as per Population Census 2011. This village is one of the old establishments of Karail area of Mohammadabad tehsil of Ghazipur.

History
Amarupur was established by Bhairav Shah's son Bishen Shah in Karail Area.

Administration
Amarupur is administered by Pradhan through its Gram Panchayat as per constitution of India and Panchayati Raj Act.

Nearby places
Ghazipur
Varanasi
Mohammadabad, Ghazipur
Kundesar
Sherpur, Ghazipur

References

External links
Villages in Ghazipur  Uttar Pradesh

Villages in Ghazipur district